Clyde Werner (born December 10, 1947) is a former American football linebacker who played six seasons in the National Football League for the Kansas City Chiefs. He played college football at the University of Washington in Seattle under head coach Jim Owens and was selected in the second round of the 1970 NFL Draft, the 52nd overall pick

College
At Washington, Werner was a three-year letterman at linebacker from 1967 through 1969. Prior to his professional career, Werner played in the Chicago Tribune All-Star Game at Soldier Field on July 31 against the Chiefs.

References

External links
 

1947 births
Living people
American football linebackers
Washington Huskies football players
Kansas City Chiefs players
People from Munising, Michigan